Gregory Tsamblak or Grigorij Camblak (c. 1365–1420) was a Bulgarian writer and cleric. He was the pretended Metropolitan of Lithuania between 1413 and 1420. A Bulgarian noble, Tsamblak lived and worked in Bulgaria, but also in Medieval Serbia and Kievan Rus'. His literary works represent a heritage of the national literature of Serbia, particularly the style of Old Serbian Vita made popular in the monasteries of the 12th century.

Life
He was born in Tarnovo, the capital of the Second Bulgarian Empire, the son of a rich family. His cousin was Cyprian, Metropolitan of Kiev. Tsamblak was a disciple of the prominent Bulgarian hesychast writer Patriarch Evtimiy of Bulgaria. Bulgaria fell under Ottoman domination following the Bulgarian-Ottoman Wars. Following this, he emigrated first to Constantinople, then became presbyter of the Church of Wallachia and Moldavia. He then went to Serbia where he was abbot of Visoki Dečani. Tsamblak stayed in Serbia from 1402 until his departure for Rus. During his sojourn in Serbia at Visoki Dečani, he wrote a biography of Stephen Uroš III Dečanski of Serbia, a hymn for the church service honoring Stefan of Dečani, and a report on the transfer of the remnants of Saint Paraskeva to Serbia, and he also rewrote the Service to St Petka (Paraskeva).

Kievan Rus

In 1409, Gregory Tsamblak came to Kyiv, then ruled by Grand Duchy of Lithuania. In 1414, Grand Duke Vytautas attempted to re-establish the Metropolis of Lithuania. He arranged for a synod of bishops to elect Gregory as the Metropolitan of Lithuania. The consecration took place without the consent of  Patriarch Euthymius II of Constantinople who deposed and anathematized him and who confirmed the same in letters to Metropolitan Photius of Kiev, Emperor Manuel II Palaeologos and Grand Prince Vasily I. After Gregory’s death in the winter of 1419–1420, Photius made peace with Vytautas. As a result, the entire Metropolis of Kiev and all Rus', including Halych, was unified under Photius until his death in 1431.

Gregory participated in the Council of Constance. 

The rivalry between Vilnius and Moscow effectively ended in 1448 when Moscow began selecting the metropolitans independently without approval from the Ecumenical Patriachate, which collapsed in 1453.

Tsamblak Hill on Livingston Island in the South Shetland Islands, Antarctica, is named after Gregory Tsamblak.

See also
 Constantine of Kostenets
 Dimitar of Kratovo
 Nicodemus of Tismana
 Anonymous Athonite

References

External links
 Gregory Tsamblak at Encyclopedia of Ukraine

Bulgarian male writers
Metropolitans of Kiev and all Rus' (claimed or partially recognised)
1365 births
1420 deaths
14th-century Bulgarian writers
15th-century Bulgarian writers
People from Veliko Tarnovo
Tarnovo Literary School
Hesychasts